The flamboyant Hanson Haines House, sometimes known simply as the Castle, is a residence at 4801 Springfield Avenue in the Spruce Hill neighborhood of West Philadelphia.  The house was built in 1902-03 for Quaker banker Hanson Haines by Quaker architect Charles Balderston in a German Medieval Revival style on the exterior and in a Colonial Revival style in the interior.  It was added to the National Register of Historic Places in 1985.

References

Houses on the National Register of Historic Places in Pennsylvania
Houses completed in 1903
Houses in Philadelphia
Spruce Hill, Philadelphia
National Register of Historic Places in Philadelphia